Grand Ayatollah Mohammad Ebrahim Ansari  (Arabic:  محمد إبراهيم الأنصاري) (1936 – February 19, 2011) was an Iraqi Twelver Shi'a Marja.

He has studied in seminaries of Najaf, Iraq under Grand Ayatollah Abul-Qassim Khoei, Mohammad Baqir al-Sadr, and Muhsin al-Hakim 
.

See also
List of maraji
List of deceased Maraji

Notes

External links
أوضاع العراق في
كلمة آية الله العظمى الشيخ محمد ابراهيم الانصاري بحق السيد الشهيد الصدر(قده)

Iraqi grand ayatollahs
Iraqi Islamists
Shia Islamists
1936 births
2011 deaths